Ivan Stević (born 12 March 1980) is a Serbian former professional road bicycle racer. He turned professional in 2005, riding for the Aerospace Engineering-VMG squad, before joining Toyota-United in 2006, the year he won the road race at the Serbian National Road Championships.

Career
Born in Belgrade, Stević rode for the Republic of Serbia and Montenegro at the 2004 Olympics, and for Serbia in the 2008 Olympics in Beijing, having qualified by winning the 'B' World Championships, in South Africa on 1 July 2007. Prior to racing in America, from 2000 to 2005 he rode as an amateur in Italy, amassing 20 Victories for the Aran Cucine-Cantina Tollo and Zilio teams. On 20 July 2010, Stević gave a middle finger salute while winning the fourth stage of the Tour of Qinghai Lake. He was subsequently thrown out of the race for his gesture.

On 22 October 2010, the Union Cycliste Internationale (UCI) disqualified all his results between 17 September 2008 and 16 September 2010 for the use or attempted use of a prohibited substance or method. In 2012, he competed for Serbia at the Olympics in London and took 54th place in the road race.

Major results
Source:

2001
 Yugoslavian National Road Championships
1st Under-23 road race
2nd Road race
2002
 Yugoslavian National Road Championships
1st Under-23 road race
3rd Road race
 1st Trofeo Mario Zanchi
2003
 Serbia and Montenegro National Road Championships
1st Road race
2nd Time trial
 2nd  Road race, UCI B World Championships
 9th Overall Tour d'Egypte
2004
 1st Gran Premio San Basso
 1st La Ciociarissima
 3rd Trofeo Internazionale Bastianelli
 4th Overall Giro Ciclisto delle Provincia di Cosenza
1st Stage 2
 9th Gran Premio San Giuseppe
2005
 1st Road race, Serbia and Montenegro National Road Championships
 1st Overall Tobago International
 1st Overall Bermuda GP
 1st Stage 4 The Paths of King Nikola
 2nd Overall Vuelta de Bisbee
1st Prologue, Stages 1 & 2
 2nd Overall Tour of the Gila
 4th Overall Sea Otter Classic
1st Stage 1
 5th Overall Tour de Serbie
1st Stage 6
 6th Road race, Mediterranean Games
 8th Reading Classic
 9th Lancaster Classic
2006
 1st  Road race, Serbian National Road Championships
 1st Maxxis Georgia Cup
 1st Habitat for Humanity Road Race
 Tri-Peaks Challenge
1st Stages 1 & 3
 1st Stage 5 Nature Valley Grand Prix
 2nd Overall Joe Martin Stage Race
2007
 1st  Road race, UCI B World Championships
 1st Overall Nature Valley Grand Prix
1st Stage 1
 1st Stage 2 Tour de Georgia
 1st Stage 3 Tri-Peaks Challenge
 2nd Overall Joe Martin Stage Race
2008
 1st Putevima Vukovog Kraja
 Tulsa Tough
1st Stages 2 & 3
 2nd Overall Tour de Hongrie
 3rd Overall Nature Valley Grand Prix

2009
 1st  Road race, Balkan Road Championships
 1st  Road race, Serbian National Road Championships
 1st Overall Generalni Plasman Liga
 1st Beograd–Čačak
 1st Velika Nagrade Čubure
 5th Overall Tour de Serbie
 6th Overall Grand Prix Bradlo
 10th Overall Grand Prix Cycliste de Gemenc
2010
 1st Velika Nagrada Novog Sad
 1st Beograd–Čačak
 1st Stage 4 Tour of Qinghai Lake
 2nd Overall Generalni Plasman Liga
 5th Memorial Oleg Dyachenko
 7th Grand Prix of Moscow

2010
 1st Stage 9 Tour of Bulgaria
2011
 1st Overall Tour de Serbie
 1st Mayor Cup
 2nd Overall Five Rings of Moscow
 2nd Velika Nagrada Novog Sad
 2nd Tour of Vojvodina I
 5th Jūrmala Grand Prix
 6th Banja Luka–Belgrade II
 7th Banja Luka–Belgrade I
 10th Grand Prix of Moscow
2012
 1st  Time trial, Serbian National Road Championships
 1st Overall Grand Prix of Sochi
1st Points classification
 2nd Overall Five Rings of Moscow
1st Stage 1
 3rd Grand Prix of Moscow
 7th Mayor Cup
2013
 1st  Road race, Serbian National Road Championships
 1st  Overall Tour de Serbie
 1st Overall Cupa Mun. Reghin
 1st Stage 2 Delta Bike Tour
 2nd  Road race, Balkan Road Championships
 2nd Overall Turul Dobrogei
 3rd Overall Tour of Romania
 3rd Velika Nagrada Novog Sad
 7th Banja Luka–Belgrade I
 7th Beograd–Čačak
2014
 1st Banja Luka–Belgrade II
 Tour de Serbie
1st  Points classification
1st  Bora Ivkovic Memorial Trophy
 Serbian National Road Championships
2nd Road race
2nd Time trial
 8th Banja Luka–Belgrade I
 8th Grand Prix Sarajevo
2015
 1st  Road race, Serbian National Road Championships
 1st Stage 5 Tour of Bulgaria
 3rd Belgrade–Banja Luka II
 4th Overall Tour of Çanakkale
 4th Overall International Tour of Torku Mevlana
1st Stage 1
 4th Krasnodar–Anapa
 5th Overall Tour de Serbie
 6th Overall Tour of Mersin
 6th Overall Tour of Ankara

Major championship results

References

External links
 
 
 Profile on toyota-united.com
 Profile on VELOBIOS

1980 births
Serbian male cyclists
Living people
Olympic cyclists of Serbia and Montenegro
Olympic cyclists of Serbia
Cyclists at the 2004 Summer Olympics
Cyclists at the 2008 Summer Olympics
Cyclists at the 2012 Summer Olympics
Cyclists at the 2016 Summer Olympics
Sportspeople from Belgrade
Doping cases in cycling
Serbian sportspeople in doping cases
Competitors at the 2005 Mediterranean Games
Mediterranean Games competitors for Serbia and Montenegro